Jill Robb  (1934 – 16 January 2022) was an English-born Australian film producer and executive who worked mostly in Australia.

Biography
Robb began in the film industry as a stand in for Jill Adams on Dust in the Sun (1958).

Robb was a founding board member of the Australian Film Commission, inaugural CEO of the Victorian Film Corporation (now Film Victoria) and a member of the Film Victoria Board from 1983 to 1989.

Robb served for many years on the Board of the Playbox Theatre Company during the difficult years following the 1984 fire. She left at the end of 1989.

She was made a Member of the Order of Australia in the 2011 Australia Day Honours for "service to the Australian film and television industries as a producer, through executive roles with industry organisations, and as a mentor to emerging filmmakers". 

She died on 16 January 2022, at the age of 87.

Select credits
The Fourth Wish (1976) – associate producer
Dawn! (1979) – executive producer
Careful, He Might Hear You (1983) – producer
Phoenix (1992–93) (TV series) – executive producer
Stark (1993) (mini series) – executive producer
Secrets (1993–94) (TV series) – executive producer

References

External links

1934 births
2022 deaths
Australian film producers
British emigrants to Australia
Members of the Order of Australia